Matschie is a surname. Notable people with the surname include:

 Christoph Matschie (born 1961), German politician
  (born 1953), German photographer
 Paul Matschie (1861–1926), German zoologist

German-language surnames